Love Visions is Nobunny's debut LP album, released in 2008. All the songs were written by Justin Champlin except for "Somewhere New," written by The Yolks.

Production
Champlin recorded the album at home, playing the majority of the instruments himself.

Artwork
The cover is an homage to the Ramones' debut album.

Critical reception
PopMatters called the album "a quick and dirty blast of lo-fi garage rock that would feel right at home on both a Nuggets compilation and a late-70s NYC punk club." AllMusic called it "both undeniably catchy and just a little strange--power pop confection colliding with psycho-trash style." Tiny Mix Tapes called it "stripped-bare, no-frills garage punk." SF Weekly declared it "a sonic wad of doo-wop and bubblegum-punk-pop that's smashed up and oozing for a rechew somewhere beneath an autoshop desk in Rock 'n' Roll High School."

Track listing 

 "Nobunny Loves You"
 "I Know I Know"
 "Mess Me Up"
 "I Am A Girlfriend"
 "Tina Goes To Work"
 "Chuck Berry Holiday"
 "Boneyard"
 "Somewhere New"
 "Church Mouse"
 "It's True"
 "Don't Know Don't Care"
 "Not That Good"

References

2008 albums